Gao-Saney is a medieval town close to Gao, the capital of the Gao Empire, situated on the eastern Niger Bend in the present-day Republic of Mali. Its ruins are four km distant from the royal town of Gao.

Gao-Saney became well-known among African historians because French administrators discovered here in a cave covered with sand in 1939 several finely carved marble stelae produced in Almeria in Southern Spain. Their inscriptions bear witness of three kings of a Muslim dynasty bearing as loan names the names of Muhammad and his two successors. From the dates of their deaths it appears that these kings of Gao ruled at the end of the eleventh and the beginning of the twelfth centuries CE. 

According to recent research, the Zaghe kings commemorated by the stelae are identical with the kings of the Za dynasty whose names were recorded by the chroniclers of Timbuktu in the Ta'rikh al-Sudan and in the Ta'rikh al-Fattash. Their Islamic loan name is in one case complemented by their African name. It is on the basis of their common ancestral name Zaghe corresponding to Za and the third royal name Yama b. Kama provided in addition to 'Umar b. al-Khattab that the identity between the Zaghe and the Za could be established.

It appears from this table that Yama b. Kima (or 'Umar b. al-Khattab), the third king of the stelae of Gao-Saney, is identical with the 18th ruler of the list of Za kings. His name is given in the Ta'rikh al-Fattash (1665) as Yama-Kitsi and in the Ta'rikh al-Sudan (1655) as  Biyu-Ki-Kima. On account of this identification the dynastic history of the Gao Empire can now to be established on a solid documentary basis.

Bibliography 
 Hunwick, John: "Gao and the Almoravids: a hypothesis", in B. Swartz and R. Dumett (eds.), West African Culture Dynamics, The Hague, 413-430.
 Insoll, Timothy: Islam, Archaeology and History: Gao Region (Mali) ca. AD 900-1250, Oxford 1996. 
 Lange, Dierk: Ancient Kingdoms of West Africa, Dettelbach 2004 (here pp. 495–544).
 --: "Review of P. Moraes Farias, Medieval Inscriptions (2003)", Afrika und Übersee, 87 (2004), 302-5
  Moraes Farias, Paolo de: Arabic Medieval Inscriptions from the Republic of Mali, Oxford 2003 (for the three kings see pp. 3, 7-8, 15).
 Sauvaget, Jean: "Les épitaphes royales de Gao", Bulletin de l'IFAN, series B, 12, 1950, 418-440.

References

See also 
 Gao Empire
Songhay Empire

Gao Region